SOML may refer to:

 Save Our Marine Life, an Australian environmental advocacy organisation
 School of MAGTF Logistics at the U.S. Marine Corps University
 Steward Observatory Mirror Lab
 The Story of My Life (disambiguation)
 Semantic Objects Modeling Language - language for describing business objects defined by Ontotext